Trashiyangtse District  is one of the twenty dzongkhags (districts) comprising Bhutan. It was created in 1992 when Trashiyangtse district was split off from Trashigang District. At an elevation of 1750–1880 m, Trashi yangtse dzongkhag is rich of culture filled with sacred places blessed by Guru Rimpoche and dwelled by Yangtseps, Tshanglas, Bramis from Tawang, Khengpas from Zhemgang and Kurtoeps from Lhuentse.

Trashiyangtse was named by Terton Pema Lingpa during his visit in 15th century meaning; (the fortress of the auspicious fortune).

The northern part of Trashiyangtse encompasses the skills of woodturning and paper making(dzongkha: དལ་ཤོག). Southern part mainly depends on cash crops and animals.

The district seat is Trashiyangtse.

Languages
Three major languages are spoken in Trashiyangtse. In the north, including Bumdeling inhabitants speak Dzala. In the south, Tshangla (Sharchopkha), the lingua franca of eastern Bhutan, is spoken in Jamkhar, Khamdang, Yalang and Ramjar Gewogs. In Tomzhangtshen Gewog, residents speak Chocha Ngacha and khengkha.

Administrative divisions
Trashiyangste District is divided into eight village blocks (or gewogs):

Bumdeling Gewog
Jamkhar Gewog
Khamdang Gewog
Ramjar Gewog
Toetsho Gewog
Tomzhangtshen Gewog
Trashiyangtse Gewog
Yalang Gewog

Protected areas
Trashiyangtse District contains Kholong Chu Wildlife Sanctuary, established in 1993, itself part of the larger Bumdeling Wildlife Sanctuary. Bumdeling Wildlife Sanctuary currently covers the northern half of Trashiyangtse (the gewogs of Bumdeling and Yangste), as well as substantial portions of neighboring districts.

See also
Districts of Bhutan
Kurtoed Province

References

External links
Trashiyangtse dzongkhag administration website

 
Districts of Bhutan